In enzymology, a meso-tartrate dehydrogenase is an enzyme that catalyzes the chemical reaction

meso-tartrate + NAD+  dihydroxyfumarate + NADH + H+

Thus, the two substrates of this enzyme are meso-tartaric acid and NAD+, whereas its 3 products are dihydroxyfumarate, NADH, and H+.

This enzyme belongs to the family of oxidoreductases, specifically those acting on the CH-CH group of donor with NAD+ or NADP+ as acceptor.  The systematic name of this enzyme class is meso-tartrate:NAD+ oxidoreductase. This enzyme participates in glyoxylic acid and dicarboxylic acid metabolism.

References

 

EC 1.3.1
NADH-dependent enzymes
Enzymes of unknown structure